A prologue is a prefatory piece of writing.

Prologue may also refer to:
A prologue time trial, a short opening stage often used in road cycling races

Books
Prologue (magazine),  published by National Archives and Records Administration, USA
Prologue (Prose Edda), Icelandic literature
Prologue, a Canadian book distributor owned by Renaud-Bray
The Prologue of the Gospel of John, sometimes known as the Hymn to the Word

Film and TV
 Prologue (2015 film), an Academy Award nominated animated short by Richard Williams
 Prologue (1970 film), a 1970 Canadian film directed by Robin Spry

Music

Albums
Prologue, album by Akina Nakamori
Prologue (Renaissance album), 1972 album
"Prologue", song by Electric Light Orchestra on their album Time
Prologue (Elton John album), 2001 album
Prologue: The Art of War/Cherry Blossom Epitaph, 2005 EP by Behind Crimson Eyes
Prologue, album by Gin Lee
Prologue, album by The Milk Carton Kids

Songs
"Prologue", a song by Susumu Hirasawa on the 1995 album Sim City
"Prologue", a song from My Arms, Your Hearse by Opeth
"Prologue", a song from Three Friends by Gentle Giant
"Prologue", a 2012 song by Lower Than Atlantis from their album Changing Tune

Others
Prologue (video game), an upcoming video game by PUBG Corporation
Prologue (2022 ice show), produced by Japanese figure skater Yuzuru Hanyu
Honda Prologue, an electric vehicle

See also
General Prologue, the assumed title of the series of portraits that precedes Chaucer's The Canterbury Tales
Prolog, programming language